The Jiexiu East railway station is a railway station of Datong–Xi'an Passenger Railway that is located in Jiexiu, Shanxi, China. It started operation on July 1, 2014, along with the Railway.

Railway stations in China opened in 2014
Railway stations in Shanxi